Rudolf Fila (19 July 1932 Příbram na Morave, Czechoslovakia - 11 February 2015 Bratislava, Slovakia) was a Slovak painter, educator and author, best known for his artistic reinterpretations of the works of Gustav Klimt. He resided in Bratislava, Slovakia.

History
1950-1952: Attended the School of Applied Art in Brno
1952-1958: Attended the Academy of Fine Arts in Bratislava
1960: began teaching at the High School for Applied Art in Bratislava
1960s: Represented at international exhibitions
1971: Exhibition in Zürich
1990: moved to the Academy of Fine Arts in Bratislava
1993-1996: Exhibitions in Vienna, Budapest, Warsaw, Ulm, Châteauroux, London, Novara and Paris

Art
Fila's works are represented in the collections of the Slovak National Gallery, the National Gallery in Prague, the Museum of the 20th Century in Vienna, the permanent exhibition of the Credit Suisse Art Collection in London and other cities in Europe and the United States.

Publications

References

Citations

General references

Slovak painters
1932 births
2015 deaths